The Holocaust in the Soviet Union is the Nazi German persecution of Jews, Roma and homosexuals as part of the Holocaust in World War II. It may also refer to the Holocaust in the Baltic states, annexed by the Soviet Union before the start of Operation Barbarossa. 

At the start of the conflict, there were estimated to be approximately five million Jews in the Soviet Union of whom four million lived in the regions occupied by Nazi Germany in 1941 and 1942. The majority of Soviet Jews murdered in the Holocaust were killed in the first nine months of the occupation during the so-called Holocaust by Bullets. Approximately 1.5 million Jews succeeded in fleeing eastwards into Soviet territory; it is thought that 1.152 million Soviet Jews had been murdered by December 1942.

Background

The Holocaust by Soviet Socialist Republic 
 The Holocaust in Byelorussia
 The Holocaust in Estonia
 The Holocaust in Latvia
 The Holocaust in Lithuania
 The Holocaust in Russia
 The Holocaust in Ukraine

Soviet policy and response 
Approximately 300,000 to 500,000 Soviet Jews served in the Red Army during the conflict. The Jewish Anti-Fascist Committee, established in 1941, was active in propagandising for the Soviet war effort but was treated with suspicion. The Soviet press, tightly censored, often deliberately obscured the particular anti-Jewish motivation of the Holocaust.

See also
 Einsatzgruppen
 Joseph Stalin and antisemitism
 Holocaust by Bullets (book)

References

Further reading

, ch. 6.

Jews and Judaism in the Soviet Union
The Holocaust by country